Davies-Jones, a Welsh double-barrelled name, may refer to:
Alex Davies-Jones, British Member of Parliament elected 2019
Emma Davies Jones (born 1978), British cyclist
Sir Evan Davies Jones, 1st Baronet (1859–1949), Welsh civil engineer
Katherine Davies Jones (1860–1943), American botanist
Robert Davies-Jones, British scientist

See also
Davies (surname)
Jones (surname)

Surnames
Surnames of Welsh origin
Compound surnames